John James Ward (September 28, 1920 – January 10, 2011) was an American prelate of the Roman Catholic Church. He served as an auxiliary bishop of the Archdiocese of Los Angeles from 1963 to 1996. Prior to his death, he was just one of three American bishops still living to have participated in the Second Vatican Council.

Biography
One of two sons, Ward was born in Los Angeles, California, to Irish immigrants Hugh and Mary (McHugh) Ward. He entered St. John's Seminary in 1940, and was ordained to the priesthood by Archbishop John Cantwell on May 4, 1946. From 1949 to 1952, he studied at The Catholic University of America School of Canon Law in Washington, D.C., where he earned a licentiate in canon law.

On October 16, 1963, he was appointed Auxiliary Bishop of Los Angeles and Titular Bishop of Bria by Pope Paul VI. He received his episcopal consecration on the following December 12 from James Cardinal McIntyre, with Archbishop Joseph McGucken and Bishop Alden Bell serving as co-consecrators. Attending the Second Vatican Council from 1964 to 1965, he later became vicar general of the archdiocese in 1970 and episcopal vicar of Our Lady of the Angels Pastoral Region in 1986. In addition to his duties as bishop, he was pastor of St. Timothy's Church.

Upon reaching the mandatory retirement age of 75, Ward resigned from his post as an auxiliary bishop on May 7, 1996. He was named Titular Bishop of California on June 15, 1996. Ward died of natural causes on January 10, 2011, at the age of 90.

References

External links
Archdiocese of Los Angeles
Los Angeles Times article

1920 births
2011 deaths
Clergy from Los Angeles
20th-century Roman Catholic bishops in the United States
Participants in the Second Vatican Council
Catholic University of America alumni
Burials at the Cathedral of Our Lady of the Angels
Catholics from California
Catholic University of America School of Canon Law alumni